Mark Morettini (born October 24, 1962) is an American actor. He is most known for the role of Correctional Officer Rizzo Green on the TV series Prison Break.

Early life
Morettini was born in Providence, Rhode Island, but raised in East Providence. He started theater in college and moved to Chicago to continue his career, starring in various productions, as well as roles in movies.

Personal life
At one point he lived in Lake Bluff, Illinois. He is the father of three children. He lives in New York City with his wife, Megan Schneid Morettini.

Career
He toured with George Wendt and Richard Thomas in 12 Angry Men as Juror #7, for 2 "seasons". On Broadway he appeared in "Pal Joey" and "A View From The Bridge".

Filmography

External links
 

Living people
American male film actors
American male television actors
American male stage actors
1962 births
Male actors from Rhode Island
Actors from Providence, Rhode Island
People from Lake Bluff, Illinois